Dorothy Antoinette (Toni) LaSelle (1901–2002) was an American artist and art historian.

Biography 
LaSelle was born in Beatrice, Nebraska, in 1901.  LaSelle earned a BA from Nebraska Wesleyan University in 1923 and an MA in art history from the University of Chicago in 1926.

LaSelle taught at Texas Woman's University from 1928–1972 and was responsible for developing the art history program there. She studied with Hans Hofmann in Provincetown, Massachusetts. LaSelle's work is in the collection of the Museum of Fine Arts, Houston, the Amon Carter Museum of American Art, Dallas; the Modern Art Museum of Fort Worth, and the Dallas Museum of Art.

LaSelle died in Denton, Texas, in 2002 at the age of 100.

Career
Toni LaSelle's deep interest and engagement with the tradition of European modernism was a defining factor in her artistic development and output. Growing up in the American Midwest far from major cultural centers, LaSelle was nevertheless a voracious and intuitive student of modernism. The artist discovered Post-Impressionism and Cubism while attending Nebraska Wesleyan University for her BA (1923). Images from the iconic 1913 Armory show served as a catalyst for LaSelle's artistic lineage that stems from European modernism. While completing her Master's in art history from the University of Chicago (1926), LaSelle wrote her thesis on the indigenous masks of New Guinea in the Field Museum collection and their influence on the development of Cubism in Paris. After graduating, she spend six months studying in England, Italy, and France.

From 1928-1972, LaSelle was an art instructor and professor at The College of Industrial Arts (renamed as Texas Women's University), while simultaneously engaging with the burgeoning concepts and processes of modernism as part of her own intellectual and artistic pursuit. During sabbaticals and summers, she sought out teachers and mentors, the most influential being European émigrés Hans Hofmann and Lázló Moholy-Nagy. LaSelle's reputation grew within her region and she became an acknowledged expert on the new trends in art, periodically giving museums lectures on Hofmann, Moholy-Nagy as well as other European artists such as Piet Mondrian, Jean Dubuffet, and Pablo Picasso. In 1942 Moholy-Nagy traveled to Texas to teach workshops for LaSelle's students, and she subsequently studied with Moholy-Nagy and Gyorgy Kepes at the Chicago Bauhaus in the summers of 1942 and 1943. Additionally, LaSelle was instrumental in organizing a show at the Dallas Museum of Art for Hofmann in 1947.

In 1959 the Fort Worth Art Center held a retrospective of LaSelle's work. In 2018 LaSelle was featured in the Frieze Masters Spotlight of the Frieze Art Fair in London, with curator Carrie Scott stating "Overlooked during her own lifetime by art historical cannons mostly because of her gender, LaSelle's work is a stellar example of the vitality of non-objective painting at midcentury". In 2021 the Inman Gallery in Houston mounted an exhibition Toni LaSelle: A State of Becoming.

References

External links
Images of LaSelle's work on Inman Gallery

1901 births
2002 deaths
American women painters
20th-century American women artists